South Boösaule Mons, the highest mountain of Jupiter's moon Io, is one of the tallest mountains in the Solar System. It is located just northwest of the volcano Pele, in the Boösaule Montes.

The official name of the mountain range was given in honor of the cave in Egypt where Io gave birth to Epaphus, and approved by the IAU in 1985.

Size 
South Boösaule has a relative height of 18.2 km (17.5 km from the foot), dimensions of 145 × 159 km (the diameter of the mountain range is 540 km), and it covers an area of 17,900 km2.

On the south-east side of the mountain there is a steep cliff up to 15 km high.

See also 
 List of tallest mountains in the Solar System

References

External links 

 Map of the surroundings of the array Boösaule

Mountains on Io (moon)
Surface features of Jupiter's moons